Samsaram Oka Chadarangam  is a 1987 Indian Telugu-language drama film produced by M. Saravanan and M. Balasubramanian of AVM Productions and directed by S. P. Muthuraman. The film stars Gollapudi Maruthi Rao, Sarath Babu, Rajendra Prasad and Suhasini, with music composed by Chakravarthy. It is a remake of the studio's own Tamil film Samsaram Adhu Minsaram (1986). The film won three Nandi Awards.

Plot 
Appala Narsayya is an ordinary middle-class man who makes a simple living as a Central Government clerk. His family, a typical South Indian joint family, includes his dutiful wife, Godavari, his oldest son Prakash, a junior officer at Indian Oil, and his wife Uma, his second son Raghava, a factory worker, his youngest son Kaali Dasu, a useless fellow who has failed his high school exams twice, and his daughter Sarojini. The modest income from his government job barely provides for his family's needs. His sons contribute some amounts in proportion to their incomes. The family gets by, but Appala Narsayya worries about the future. Raghava and Sarojini are not yet married, and Kaali Dasu has a bleak future if he does not graduate high school. Sarojini is a particular worry; her beauty and charm are matched by her arrogance and contempt. She summarily rejects any marriage proposal, and her obstinate demeanor causes great concern to Appala Narsayya. He nonetheless plows on through life hoping for solutions to his difficulties.

The community matchmaker brings Appala Narsayya a promising alliance. It is a good family. The groom is a junior officer at BHEL and his father owns a garment shop in the city. The meeting starts off well. But Sarojini, true to form, rejects the alliance, and the groom's party abruptly leaves. Appala Narsayya visits them to apologize for the incident. The groom's father turns out to be an understanding and forward-thinking man. Looking past Sarojini's immaturity and recognizing Appala Narsayya to be a good and honest man, he offers his daughter Vasantha as a prospective partner for Raghava. He declares, as a veiled insult, that his obedient daughter Vasantha will accept his decision. Not to be outdone, Appala Narsayya quickly accepts the claim that his son is similarly respectful of his wishes.

When Appala Narsayya returns home, Sarojini informs him that she has found her own partner in Peter Samuel, a Catholic colleague from her workplace — an unthinkable notion for Appala Narsayya and Godavari. But when Appala Narsayya visits Peter's father Edmund Samuel, he is surprised. Edmund Samuel turns out to be compassionate, tolerant, and accepting of Sarojini's belligerence. Appala Narsayya agrees to the alliance. Prakash remains opposed to Sarojini's choice, but nonetheless obtains a loan to finance her wedding. Sarojini and Peter are married, and Raghava and Vasantha are married.

After an initial period of honeymoon bliss, the troubles start again. Sarojini returns home late one night after an office party, with another male colleague on a bike. When Peter's father questions her, she brashly cites her independence and refuses to answer him. Peter tries to talk to her, but she adamantly turns him off too. After a big fight, she walks out. Back at Appala Narsayya's home, Vasantha is frustrated because her time is increasingly devoted to tutoring Kaalidasu (so he can clear his exams). She is unable to have any quiet time with Raghava, and this is further complicated by the joint family arrangement where personal space is limited anyway. She ends up in a big fight with Raghava, and she ultimately walks out.

Vasantha returns to an unwelcome reception at her own home. Her father initially tries to reason with her, but when she remains indignant, he firmly instructs her to return to her husband and work out their problems. She finally understands the message and returns home. Raghava, who had followed her, reinforces her father's message. However, he clearly prioritizes Kaalidasu's education over her need for quiet time. She accepts this as a temporary necessity but remains unhappy nonetheless. There is an unintended side-effect in that Sarojini, having seen how Raghava went to fetch his wife, reaffirms her stand to remain away from Peter until Peter crawls back to get her.

There is a greater crisis when Prakash reduces his monthly contribution to the family fund. He cites reasons of reduced consumption (his wife is away at her parents' house due to pregnancy), excess burden (Sarojini, the troublemaker, has returned), and limited income (he has to plan for his own family). Appala Narsayya advises him that the fund is not designed as a mathematical formula, but rather as a communal fund to ensure the family runs smoothly. He reminds Prakash that he had spent the largest fractions of his income, without regard to return or reward, on Prakash's upbringing and education. Prakash disputes these claims. The argument erupts into a terrible fight. Appala Narsayya disowns Prakash and kicks him out. Prakash refuses to leave until his loans are paid off. Appala Narsayya orders a line to be drawn midway through the house. He banishes Prakash to one side of the line and forbids everyone from speaking to Prakash. Appala Narsayya declares that Prakash must leave when his loans have been repaid.

When Uma returns with her new baby, she is shocked to find so many problems. She works with Chilakamma, the longtime household maid, and Godavari (Appala Narsayya's wife) to fix these troubles and restore harmony. She starts by visiting Edmund Samuel. On her suggestion, Edmund Samuel returns to Appala Narsayya's house and starts a loud squabble with Chilakamma. Edmund Samuel brings divorce papers. Sarojini is shaken. Chilakamma and Godavari compel her, in the heat of the fight with Edmund Samuel, to sign the papers. Edmund Samuel completes the charade by handing her an invitation to Peter's upcoming wedding with another girl. Sarojini finally realizes the gravity of the situation. She returns to Peter and his father. They forgive her and warmly accept her again.

Uma's second task is to reconcile Raghava and Vasantha. She calls Raghava at work and gently rebukes him for not attending to his wife's needs. Raghava plans a vacation where he and Vasantha are able to revive their relationship, reaffirm their priorities and return to a new life together. Vasantha continues tutoring Kaalidasu. He finally passes his exams. Uma has mixed feelings: she is glad that the troubles have been resolved, but she is sad that Raghava and Bharathi, still in compliance with Appala Narsayya's orders, have not spoken a word with her.

Finally, Uma tackles the raging conflict between Prakash and Appala Narsayya. She scans his expenses and reminds him that costs are actually reduced when items are obtained in larger quantities. She also reminds him that Appala Narsayya does not charge rent. She also reminds him of his filial responsibilities. In the meantime, Chilakamma reminds Appala Narsayya that his family is all he has and that he should think of his children and grandchildren as his legacy and not his adversaries. Prakash and Appala Narsayya are finally reconciled.

Uma makes her final move when Prakash is about to step across the line. She reminds everyone that what started as small arguments ended up as a huge conflict that nearly broke up the family. She suggests that it is best for her and Prakash to move out. The house is probably too cramped for two couples to be comfortable. She promises to visit every weekend and spend time with the family. The film ends with Prakash and Uma making regular visits to see everyone.

Cast 

Sarath Babu as Prakash
Suhasini as Uma
Sowcar Janaki as Chilakamma
Gollapudi Maruthi Rao as Appala Narsayya
Nutan Prasad as Edmund Samuel
Rajendra Prasad as Raghava
Hemasundar as Jagannatham
Master Haja Sheriff as Kalidasu
Dilip as Peter
Omakuchi Narasimhan as Neelakantham
Veerayya
Karthik
Nagabhushan Rao
Moorthy
Krishna Chaitanya
Annapoorna as Godavari
Mucherla Aruna as Vasantha
Kalpana as Sarojani
Lalitha Sarma
C. H. Vijaya

Soundtrack 
Music composed by Chakravarthy. Lyrics were written by Veturi.

Accolades 
Nandi Awards
Best Story Writer – Visu
Best Supporting Actress – Sowkar Janaki
Best Child Actor – Master Sravan Kumar

References

External links 
 

1980s Telugu-language films
1987 drama films
1987 films
AVM Productions films
Films directed by S. P. Muthuraman
Films scored by K. Chakravarthy
Indian drama films
Telugu remakes of Tamil films